Titania is a ballet in one act, choreographed by Marius Petipa to music by Cesare Pugni, first presented by the Imperial Ballet on November 18/30 (Julian/Gregorian calendar dates), 1866 for the Imperial court at the theatre of the Mikhailovsky Palace, St. Petersburg, Russia.

Ballets by Marius Petipa
Ballets by Cesare Pugni
1866 ballet premieres
Ballets premiered in Saint Petersburg